Me Against the World is a 1995 album by 2Pac.

Me Against the World may also refer to:

 Me Against the World (compilation album), by Deep Elm Records, 2002
 "Me Against the World", a song by Simple Plan from Still Not Getting Any...
 "Me Against the World", a song by Lizzy Borden from Visual Lies

See also
Us Against the World (disambiguation)